The 2019 Philadelphia Freedoms season was the 19th season of the franchise (in its current incarnation) in World TeamTennis (WTT).

Team Personnel

On-court personnel
 Craig Kardon, Head Coach
 Raquel Atawo
 Danielle Collins
 Christopher Eubanks 
 Madison Keys
 Mitchell Krueger 
 Feliciano López
 Fabrice Martin
 Adrián Menéndez
 Adrian Mannarino 
 Tommy Paul 
 Taylor Townsend
 Donald Young

Front office
 Billie Jean King – Owner
 Barbara Perry – General Manager

References

Philadelphia Freedoms 2020
Philadelphia Freedoms season